The 59th Rifle Division was an infantry division of the Red Army and briefly of the Soviet Army.

It was originally formed in 1932 as the 1st Kolkhoz Rifle Division, and redesignated as the 59th Rifle Division in 1936.

History

Interwar period 
The division was formed in March 1932 as the 1st Kolkhoz Rifle Division, part of the Special Kolkhoz Corps of the Special Red Banner Far Eastern Army, covering the Grodekovo direction against expected Japanese attack with headquarters in Primorsky Oblast. A voluntary program to resettle demobilized Red Army soldiers and their families in the border areas of the Soviet Far East was established in 1929–1930, in order to increase the population and economic activity of such areas, supply food to the Special Red Banner Far Eastern Army, and to provide a force for its defense. By 1932 42 Red Army Kolkhozes had been established under the program. However, due to labor shortages and a lack of construction materials, engineers, and technicians, most of the settlers returned to their former homes; by 1932, only 1,476 remained out of 8,134 who arrived between 1930 and 1932. To address the issues, the Special Kolkhoz Corps was created, utilizing conscripts to garrison the frontier area.

Commanders 
The following commanders led the division during its existence:

 Kombrig (promoted to Major General 4 June 1940) Vasily Glazunov (3 July 1939–23 June 1941)
 Colonel (promoted to Major General 8 December 1941) Alexey Gnechko (9 July 1941–9 January 1942)
 Colonel (promoted to Major General 7 December 1942) Ivan Pashkov (10 January 1942–25 June 1943)
 Colonel Fyodor Suin (26 June 1943–12 May 1944)
 Colonel (promoted to Major General 20 April 1945) Matvey Batrakov (31 May 1944–after 3 September 1945)

See also 

 Military settlement

References

Citations

Bibliography 

 
 
 
 
 
 
 
 
 
 

Infantry divisions of the Soviet Union
Infantry divisions of the Soviet Union in World War II
Military units and formations established in 1936
Military units and formations disestablished in 1946